The basketball section of Olympique Lille (whose nickname is OL) founded in 1924 in Lille and disappeared in the mid-1940s.

History 
Although the OL was born in 1902, the club creates the basketball section only in 1924. Under the amateur status, OL enjoyed success in the 1930s, reaching three times the France championship final. The club became Champion of France during the 1933–1934 season, but lost its other two championship games in the 1932-33 and 1934-1935 seasons.

Honours 

French League
 Winners (1): 1933-34

Notable players 
Peter Boel was called for national team of France. He participated in the first EuroBasket in the history in 1935 but also on the basketball tournament of the 1936 Olympic Games, the first appearance of this sport at the Olympics. Georges Fontaine and Charles Fonteyne also played on olympique tournament.

References

Basketball teams in France
Basketball teams established in 1924
Sport in Lille